Valeriu Tița (born 22 April 1966) is a Romanian Former footballer and was previously the head coach of the Syria national football team. He led Syrian club Al-Ittihad Aleppo to the AFC Cup title in 2010.

Club career

Tița began his football career as a midfielder with hometown side FC Drobeta-Turnu Severin and Corvinul Hunedoara. In 1992, he moved to Morocco to play for Olympique de Casablanca under head coach Ilie Balaci, where he won the Moroccan Football League and the Arab Cup Winners' Cup twice. He then spent a few seasons with Raja Casablanca and Maghreb de Fès before returning to his homeland to become a manager. He holds a UEFA Pro License.

Coaching career

Al-Ittihad Aleppo
Tita led Al-Ittihad Aleppo to 2010 AFC Cup Finals. Al-Ittihad won the game 4–2 after penalties shoot-out against Al-Qadsia. The game was tied 1–1 after regular time and Extra Time. It was their first title.

The AFC Cup Title considered as the most honourable achievement of his coaching career and he became beloved by most Syrians.

Syria national team
On 21 December 2010, he became coach of Syria national team. In his first international friendly game, he won 1–0 against Iraq, then lost to Iraq 0–1 on a second game. Tita led Syria team in the 2011 AFC Asian Cup and won 2–1 against Saudi Arabia, and lost 1–2 to Japan and 1–2 to Jordan.

He left the Syria team after the team failed to qualify to quarter finals.

Short spells in different countries
From 2011 to 2019, Tita coached Al-Shorta in Syria, Al Naser in Kuwait, Al Sharjah in UAE, Al-Faisaly Amman in Jordan, Al-Safa and Nejmeh SC in Lebanon, Al-Orobah in Saudi Arabia, and Al-Talaba in Iraq.

On 23 July 2019, Tita came back to Iraq and signed for Al-Mina'a SC club. The Romanian coach had around 5 to 10 games to look for the players he wanted to start the next season in a more positive fashion. Tita picked 10 players from the team and wanted some new, substantial signings to improve the challenge Al-Minaa would be able to make in the Iraqi Premier League. He remained there until January 2021.

Return to Syria national team
In November 2021, he was reappointed as coach of Syria national team. He led his team during the 2021 FIFA Arab Cup, before being dismissed after two losses against United Arab Emirates and South Korea in the 2022 FIFA World Cup qualification.

Managerial statistics

Honours

Player 
Olympique Casablanca
Moroccan League: 1993–94
Arab Cup Winners' Cup: 1993, 1994

Raja Casablanca 	
Moroccan League: 1995–96
Moroccan Cup: 1995–96

Manager
Al-Ittihad Aleppo
AFC Cup: 2010

Al-Safa
Lebanese Super Cup: 2013

Nejmeh SC
Lebanese FA Cup: 2016
Lebanese Elite Cup: 2016
Lebanese Super Cup: 2016

References

1966 births
Living people
People from Drobeta-Turnu Severin
Romanian footballers
Romanian expatriate footballers
FC Drobeta-Turnu Severin players
CS Corvinul Hunedoara players
Raja CA players
Maghreb de Fès players
Expatriate footballers in Morocco
Romanian football managers
Syria national football team managers
2011 AFC Asian Cup managers
Expatriate football managers in the United Arab Emirates
Expatriate football managers in Jordan
Expatriate football managers in Lebanon
Expatriate football managers in Syria
Expatriate football managers in Kuwait
Expatriate football managers in Saudi Arabia
Expatriate football managers in Iraq
Romanian expatriate football managers
Romanian expatriate sportspeople in Morocco
Romanian expatriate sportspeople in the United Arab Emirates
Romanian expatriate sportspeople in Jordan
Romanian expatriate sportspeople in Syria
Romanian expatriate sportspeople in Kuwait
Romanian expatriate sportspeople in Iraq
Romanian expatriate sportspeople in Lebanon
Lebanese Premier League managers
Nejmeh SC managers
Al-Faisaly SC managers
Al-Sharjah SCC managers
Al-Mina'a SC managers
Association football midfielders
AFC Cup winning managers